Maung Mu Paing Shin is a 2000 Burmese musical drama romance film directed by Ko San Aung. The film stars Dwe, Lwin Moe, Htun Eaindra Bo and Htet Htet Moe Oo in the lead roles. This is the first and last film made by advertising director Ko San Aung, because he died unexpectedly near the cinema. The film is a remake of the 1964 black-and-white film of the same name.
 

At the 2000 Myanmar Academy Awards Presentation Ceremony, the film won Best Cinematography Award for Than Nyunt(Pan Tha).

Cast
Dwe as Myint Zaw
Lwin Moe as Moe Lwin
Htun Eaindra Bo as Ma Ma Khine
Htet Htet Moe Oo as Nyein
Myint Myint Khin as Daw Myint Myint, mother of Myint Zaw
Saw Naing as U Thite Htun, father of Ma Ma Khine
Kutho as Kutho
Thu Maung (Cameo)
Si Thu Lwin (Cameo)

References

Burmese romantic drama films
2000 films
Remakes of Burmese films
2000s Burmese-language films